Shukrawar Peth is an area of Pune in Maharashtra State, India.

It was the first local peth created in 1734 and named by the Bajirao Peshwe 1 because people used to reside in that area from his era.

References

Peths in Pune